Honda Cars India Ltd. (HCIL) is an automobile manufacturer in India owned by Honda Motor Co. Ltd. The company was established in 1995 as a joint venture called Honda Siel Cars India (HSCI). The company was renamed to HCIL in September 2012 following the sale of 3.16 percent stake owned by Usha International, making it a 100 percent subsidiary of Honda Motor Co. Ltd.

Facilities 
HCIL's first manufacturing plant was built in Greater Noida and began production in 1997. The plants original production capacity was estimated to be able to produce 30,000 cars per year, this amount was later updated to 100,000 cars per year when with the addition of a second shift of workers, an expansion to the plant, and improvements in automation.

Due to the COVID-19 pandemic and a shrinking demand for automobiles Honda has cut back production and may close one of its plants.

Models

Current models

Discontinued models 
Honda Accord (2000–2020)
Honda CR-V (2003–2020)
Honda Civic (2006–2020)
Honda Jazz (2009–2022)
Honda Brio (2011–2017)
Honda Mobilio (2014–2017)
Honda BR-V (2016–2020)
Honda WR-V (2017–2022)

Awards

See also 
Hero Honda
Honda Motorcycle & Scooter India, Private Limited
Automotive industry in India

References 

Honda
Vehicle manufacturing companies established in 1995
Car manufacturers of India
Indian subsidiaries of foreign companies
1995 establishments in Uttar Pradesh
Indian companies established in 1995